15 Penn Plaza, also known as PENN15 and Vornado Tower, is a planned office tower to be constructed by Vornado Realty Trust on Seventh Avenue between 32nd and 33rd Streets in the Midtown Manhattan neighborhood of New York City. Located opposite Pennsylvania Station, a major transit hub for the Long Island Rail Road, New Jersey Transit, Amtrak and the New York City Subway, the building will include several subway entrances, a new concourse, and a passageway that will link Penn Station with the 34th Street–Herald Square station and the 33rd Street terminal of the PATH train. Construction is stated to begin in 2024, with completion expected at the end of the 2020s.

History

Zoning approval and controversy
They embarked on what The New York Times described as "a fierce public relations, advertising and lobbying campaign" to derail the project.

On August 24, 2010, the Malkins asked the New York City Council to deny permission for the construction of the tower because it would alter the skyline and obscure the view of the western side of the Empire State Building. The approvals were also contested by historic preservationists worried about the demolition of the Hotel Pennsylvania, which was on the site of the proposed building.

While Manhattan Community Board 5 voted overwhelmingly against the proposed project, the New York City Department of City Planning approved the plan, which would allow the building to be 56% larger than standard zoning rules provide under special regulations that encourage the development of high-density office space near transit hubs.

Henry Stern, former Commissioner of the New York City Department of Parks and Recreation said the proposed building "could do irreparable harm" to the city. However, Daniel Biederman, president of the 34th Street Partnership joined union and construction officials in saying that "If there's anywhere a building of this size and bulk should be built, it's at Penn Station.

As part of the approval process, Vornado agreed to undertake $100 million in transit-related improvements that would reopen the "Gimbels passageway", which was blocked off in 1986 and would reconnect Penn Station to Herald Square at Sixth Avenue and the 34th Street–Herald Square station and the 33rd Street terminal of the Port Authority Trans-Hudson (PATH) train, which provides access to Hoboken–33rd Street, Journal Square–33rd Street (via Hoboken) and Journal Square–33rd Street trains. An updated passageway would be built to the standards of "the elegant and efficient passageways at Grand Central and Rockefeller Center" and would also have integrated access to the proposed New Jersey Transit terminal that would be constructed as part of the Access to the Region's Core tunnel that was to be constructed under the Hudson River.

On August 25, 2010, in a 47–1 vote, the City Council voted to approve construction of the building. The Council's zoning and land use committees approved the project and the full council overwhelmingly voted to approve the plan, with the only dissenter, Brooklyn Councilmember Charles Barron, voting in the negative as a protest against the absence of a guarantee by Vornado to hire minority and female construction workers. In December 2011, the building project was postponed due to low office market rents.

Construction
In April 2021, Vornado again announced plans to demolish the hotel to make way for the new skyscraper, known as Penn15. Demolition of the hotel was underway by January 2022 and is scheduled to be completed by July 2023. The building itself is planned to be completed at the end of the 2020s.

See also
List of tallest buildings in New York City

References

External links
 15 Penn Plaza at SkyscraperPage
 

Pennsylvania Plaza
Skyscraper office buildings in Manhattan
Proposed buildings and structures in New York City
Proposed skyscrapers in the United States
César Pelli buildings
Midtown Manhattan